{{DISPLAYTITLE:C21H20O11}}
The molecular formula C21H20O11 (molar mass: 448.38 g/mol, exact mass: 448.100561 u) may refer to:

 Astragalin, a flavonol
 Cynaroside, a flavone
 Kaempferol 7-O-glucoside, a flavonol
 Isoorientin, a flavone
 Maritimein, an aurone
 Orientin, a flavone
 Quercitrin, a flavonol
 Rhodionin, a flavonol rhamnoside
 Trifolin, a flavanol galactoside

Molecular formulas